Punia can refer to:

Punia (cicada), a genus of cicadas 
Punia, Lithuania, a town in Lithuania
Puniya, a surname

See also
Punia Airport
Punia Territory